Eddie "Dynamite" James (September 30, 1907 – December 26, 1958) was a running back for the Regina Roughriders and the Winnipeg Blue Bombers of the Canadian Football League.  James was inducted into the Canadian Football Hall of Fame in 1963 and into the Manitoba Sports Hall of Fame and Museum in 2004. The Eddie James Memorial Trophy is named after him. His son Gerry James also played for the Blue Bombers and also is inducted into the Canadian Football Hall of Fame.

References

Canadian Football Hall of Fame inductees
Players of Canadian football from Manitoba
Canadian football people from Winnipeg
Manitoba Sports Hall of Fame inductees
Saskatchewan Roughriders players
Winnipeg Blue Bombers players
1907 births
1958 deaths